The following radio stations broadcast on AM frequency 930 kHz: As classified by the U.S. Federal Communications Commission and the Canadian Radio-television and Telecommunications Commission, 930 AM is a regional broadcast frequency.

In Argentina 
 LV28 in Villa Maria, Córdoba
 LV7 in San Miguel de Tucuman, Tucumán
 Nativa in San Justo

In Canada

In Mexico 
 XECSDC-AM in Xalapa, Veracruz
 XETLA-AM in Santa María Asunción Tlaxiaco, Oaxaca

In the United States

In Uruguay 
 CX 20 Radio Monte Carlo in Montevideo

References

Lists of radio stations by frequency